Waverly Plantation is a historic plantation house located near Cunningham, Person County, North Carolina.  It was built about 1830, and is a Late Federal style frame dwelling consisting of a two-story, three bay by two bay main section, with an attached 1 1/2-story, one bay by two bay section.  Both sections rest on brick foundations, are sheathed in weatherboard, and have gable roofs.

The house was added to the National Register of Historic Places in 1974.

References

Plantation houses in North Carolina
Houses on the National Register of Historic Places in North Carolina
Federal architecture in North Carolina
Houses completed in 1830
Houses in Person County, North Carolina
National Register of Historic Places in Person County, North Carolina
1830 establishments in North Carolina